Fort Herkimer Church, also known as the Reformed Protestant Dutch Church of German Flatts, is a historic church located in East Herkimer, Herkimer County, New York. It was built in 1767, and expanded in 1812.  It is a two-story, rectangular grey limestone building.  The gable roof is topped by a frame cupola.

It was added to the National Register of Historic Places in 1972.

References

External links

church website

Churches on the National Register of Historic Places in New York (state)
Historic American Buildings Survey in New York (state)
Churches completed in 1767
Churches in Herkimer County, New York
1767 establishments in the Province of New York
18th-century churches in the United States
National Register of Historic Places in Herkimer County, New York